David Alan Smith (born June 23, 1959) is an American actor and writer.

Personal life 
Smith was born in Beaver Dam, Wisconsin. He attended Lincoln Elementary School and Beaver Dam High School, before studying at the University of Minnesota, where he received his BA in theatre, as well as being nominated for the National Irene Ryan Acting Award at the American College Theatre Festival.

He has been in over 500 radio and television commercials for brands including Target, SuperAmerica, Hillshire Farm, Cub Foods and John Deere. He has appeared in more than 75 stage productions, including lead roles in Rosencrantz and Guildenstern Are Dead in Minneapolis, Run for Your Wife at Wausau, Wisconsin, and A Closer Walk with Patsy Cline, at Plymouth Playhouse, Twin Cities.

A reviewer wrote that in Run for Your Wife, "Smith played the beleaguered bigamist, John Smith, to weary perfection. His British accent was believable and his physical comedy flawless." A reviewer of Rosencrantz and Guildenstern Are Dead wrote, "They are a nicely matched pair exhibiting just enough shadings of difference to make them more than ciphers. ... Smith's Guildenstern is a more practical, moody sort, who cannot understand their impending fate."

Filmography

Film

Television

Other Works

References

External links 
 
 David Alan Smith on TV Guide

1959 births
Living people
People from Beaver Dam, Wisconsin
20th-century American male actors
Male actors from Wisconsin
21st-century American male actors
American male film actors
American male television actors
American theatre directors
University of Minnesota College of Liberal Arts alumni